is a Japanese manga series written and illustrated by Akili. It has been serialized in Shogakukan's seinen manga magazine Monthly Sunday Gene-X since February 2019.

Publication
Written and illustrated by Akili, Vampeerz began serialization in Shogakukan's seinen manga magazine Monthly Sunday Gene-X on February 19, 2019. The series is set to end on April 19, 2023. Shogakukan has collected its chapters into individual tankōbon volumes. The first volume was released on August 19, 2019. As of November 17, 2022, eight volumes have been released.

In North America, the manga is licensed for English release by Denpa. The first volume was released on June 7, 2022.

Volume list

References

External links
  
 

Seinen manga
Shogakukan manga
Vampires in anime and manga
Yuri (genre) anime and manga